Victor Vlad Delamarina (until 1972 Satu Mic;) is a commune in Timiș County, Romania. It is composed of seven villages: Herendești, Honorici, Pădureni, Petroasa Mare, Pini, Victor Vlad Delamarina (commune seat) and Visag.

The commune is the birthplace of poet Victor Vlad Delamarina (1870–1896).

Name

Geography 
Victor Vlad Delamarina is located in the east of Timiș County, on the border with Caraș-Severin County, 62 km from Timișoara and 5 km from Lugoj, the nearest city. The dominant form of relief is the plain-hill. 

The climate of the area belongs to the temperate continental type, with the most favorable climatic conditions for the development of agriculture. The summers are quite warm (average temperature of 22–23 °C in July), and the winters are not too severe. The rains, on the other hand, are quite heavy (over 800 mm per year).

The vegetation is characteristic of the forest-steppe. Fir, spruce and beech forests predominate. The plain area is used for various crops such as wheat, potatoes, barley, corn, orchards of fruit trees. The fauna of the commune is rich and characteristic of the hill areas. Among the most widespread animals in this area are: wild boars, hares, pheasants, goats, etc.

History 
The first recorded mention of Victor Vlad Delamarina dates from 1717, under the name of Satulmik, after the name of a woman Mica, who, at one point, moved the village from the old hearth located on a flooded place. She gave up a piece of land she owned to relocate the locality. Victor Vlad Delamarina was part of Krassó-Szörény County, Lugoj District, in 1890, as a commune seat with 616 inhabitants. On the occasion of the territorial reorganization in 1968, the locality was named Victor Vlad Delamarina, in memory of the first dialectal poet of Romania, born here in 1870.

Demographics 

Victor Vlad Delamarina had a population of 2,604 inhabitants at the 2011 census, down 11% from the 2002 census. Most inhabitants are Romanians (69.74%), larger minorities being represented by Ukrainians (21.81%), Germans (2.04%) and Hungarians (1.08%). For 4.34% of the population, ethnicity is unknown. By religion, most inhabitants are Orthodox (76.5%), but there are also minorities of Pentecostals (7.87%), Roman Catholics (4.19%), Greek Catholics (4.03%) and Baptists (1.54%). For 4.38% of the population, religious affiliation is unknown.

References 

Communes in Timiș County
Localities in Romanian Banat